Oberstjägermeisterbach is a small river of Bavaria, Germany. It flows through the Englischer Garten in Munich. It branches off the Eisbach, and flows into the Schwabinger Bach.

See also
List of rivers of Bavaria

References

Rivers of Bavaria
0Oberstjägermeisterbach
Rivers of Germany